René Brice N'Djeya (born 9 October 1953 in Douala) is a retired Cameroonian professional footballer. He competed for the Cameroon national football team at the 1982 FIFA World Cup. He also played for Cameroon at the 1984 African Cup of Nations, where he scored a goal against Nigeria.

Career
N'Djeya played club football in Cameroon for Union Douala.

After retiring from playing football, N'Djeya started working for the ministry of railroads.

References

1953 births
Living people
Footballers from Douala
Cameroonian footballers
Cameroon international footballers
1982 FIFA World Cup players
1982 African Cup of Nations players
1984 African Cup of Nations players
Africa Cup of Nations-winning players
Union Douala players
Association football defenders